The Popular Front of Islamic Revolution Forces (PFIRF) is a political organization in Iran, founded in late 2016 by ten figures from different spectrum of conservative factions.

The group has pledged to become the main rival for Hassan Rouhani in the 2017 presidential election, intending to introduce a single candidate from conservative camp as its umbrella organization. The front nominated Ebrahim Raisi as their presidential candidate after withdrawal of Mohammad Bagher Ghalibaf. However, Raisi lost the election to Rouhani and ranked second.

2017 conventions

February 
It held its first convention on 23 February 2017, reportedly attended by 3,000 individuals from 25 parties, electing 30 members of its central council and voting for top 10 presidential prospects among its all-inclusive 21-man list. Ebrahim Raisi won the majority of votes in a plurality-at-large voting with 10 choices for each voter, the results were:

April 
The organization held its second convention on 6 April 2017 to elect the top five candidates, dropping Saeed Jalili because of his rejection of the Front’s mechanism. The results were as follows:

See also 
 Coordination Council of Islamic Revolution Forces
 Alliance of Builders of Islamic Iran

References 

Principlist political groups in Iran
Political parties established in 2016
2016 establishments in Iran
Political party alliances in Iran